Neomyopites is a genus of the family Tephritidae, better known as fruit flies.

References

Tephritinae
Tephritidae genera